Estádio do Bonfim (Bonfim Stadium) is a multi-purpose stadium in Setúbal, Portugal. It is currently used primarily for football matches for Vitória F.C. The stadium was built in 1962 and was able to hold 18,694 spectators. Currently, holds 15,497 spectators.

Estádio do Bonfim enjoys a prime location within Setubal less than 1.0 km from the main railway station and the historic city centre.

It used to be one of the most modern infrastructures in Portugal. In the present day the stadium is outdated although being one of the main symbols of the Setúbal city and Portuguese football.

On 4 February 2019, the ground staged Belenenses SAD's home Primeira Liga fixture against Moreirense F.C. due to the condition of the pitch at their regular venue, the Estádio Nacional in Oeiras. The game attracted only 298 spectators, the lowest in the history of Portugal's top division.

Portugal national football team
The following national team matches were held in the stadium.

References

Bonfim
Vitória F.C.
Multi-purpose stadiums in Portugal
Buildings and structures in Setúbal District
Buildings and structures in Setúbal
Sports venues completed in 1962